Plusiocampa is a genus of two-pronged bristletails in the family Campodeidae. There are at least 50 described species in Plusiocampa.

Species
These 54 species belong to the genus Plusiocampa:

 Plusiocampa affinis Conde, 1947 g
 Plusiocampa alhamae Conde & Sandra, 1989 g
 Plusiocampa balsani Condé, 1947 g
 Plusiocampa bonadonai Condé, 1948 g
 Plusiocampa boneti (Wygodzinsky, 1944) i c g
 Plusiocampa breuili Conde, 1955 g
 Plusiocampa bulgarica Silvestri, 1931 g
 Plusiocampa bureschi Silvestri, 1931 g
 Plusiocampa caprai Conde, 1950 g
 Plusiocampa christiani Conde & Bareth, 1996 g
 Plusiocampa corcyraea Silvestri, 1912 g
 Plusiocampa dallaii Bareth & Conde, 1984 g
 Plusiocampa dalmatica Conde, 1959 g
 Plusiocampa dargilani (Moniez, 1894) g
 Plusiocampa denisi Conde, 1947 g
 Plusiocampa dobati Conde, 1993 g
 Plusiocampa dolichopoda Bareth & Conde, 1984 g
 Plusiocampa elongata Ionescu, 1955 g
 Plusiocampa euxina Conde, 1996 g
 Plusiocampa evallonychia Silvestri, 1949 g
 Plusiocampa exsulans Conde, 1947 g
 Plusiocampa fagei Conde, 1954 g
 Plusiocampa festai Silvestri, 1932 g
 Plusiocampa friulensis Bareth & Conde, 1984 g
 Plusiocampa glabra Conde, 1984 g
 Plusiocampa grandii Silvestri, 1933 g
 Plusiocampa humicola Ionescu, 1951 g
 Plusiocampa hystricula Bareth & Conde, 1984 g
 Plusiocampa isterina Conde, 1996 g
 Plusiocampa kashiensis Chou & Tong, 1980 g
 Plusiocampa lagari Sendra & Conde, 1987 g
 Plusiocampa lagoi Silvestri, 1932 g
 Plusiocampa latens Conde, 1947 g
 Plusiocampa lindbergi Conde, 1956 g
 Plusiocampa lucenti Sendra & Conde, 1986 g
 Plusiocampa magdalenae Condé, 1957 g
 Plusiocampa nivea (Joseph, 1882) g
 Plusiocampa notabilis Silvestri, 1912 g
 Plusiocampa paolettii Bareth & Conde, 1984 g
 Plusiocampa pouadensis (Denis, 1930) g
 Plusiocampa provincialis Condé, 1949 g
 Plusiocampa remyi Conde, 1947 g
 Plusiocampa romana Conde, 1954 g
 Plusiocampa rudnica Blesic, 1992 g
 Plusiocampa rybaki Conde, 1956 g
 Plusiocampa sardiniana Conde, 1981 g
 Plusiocampa schweitzeri Conde, 1947 g
 Plusiocampa socia Conde, 1983 g
 Plusiocampa solerii Silvestri, 1932 g
 Plusiocampa spelaea Stach, 1929 g
 Plusiocampa strouhali Silvestri, 1933 g
 Plusiocampa suspiciosa Condé & Mathieu, 1958 g
 Plusiocampa vandeli Condé, 1947 g
 Plusiocampa vedovinii Condé, 1981 g

Data sources: i = ITIS, c = Catalogue of Life, g = GBIF, b = Bugguide.net

References

Further reading

 
 
 

Diplura